Victor Sutherland (February 28, 1889 – August 29, 1968) was an American stage, film, and television actor.

Career
Born in Paducah, Kentucky, Sutherland worked on stage and in motion pictures from the 1910s through the 1950s, when he also acted on television, including several episodes of Perry Mason. He was also in the original cast of the 1939 hit play Arsenic and Old Lace. At age 19, Sutherland acted in a production of Dr. Jekyll and Mr. Hyde for 25 weeks.

Sutherland made films for Fox Film Corporation, among other studios, and he acted in stock theater.

Personal life 
On October 12, 1907, Sutherland married silent film star Pearl White in Oklahoma City. She sued for divorce in 1914. He married actress Faye Cusick on May 10, 1915, in Baltimore, Maryland. Cusick sued for divorce in 1923. He also married silent film actress Anne Hamilton, with whom he had a daughter, Anne Victoria Sutherland, in 1925, and actress Linda Barrett.

Death
Sutherland died on August 29, 1968, at Crenshaw Center Hospital at the age of 79. He was interred in the Forest Lawn — Hollywood Hills Cemetery in Los Angeles, California.

Filmography

References

External links
 

1889 births
1968 deaths
20th-century American male actors
American male film actors
American male silent film actors
American male television actors
Burials at Forest Lawn Memorial Park (Hollywood Hills)
Male actors from Kentucky
People from Paducah, Kentucky